Danse Macabre Records is a record label based in Wirsberg, Germany and founded by members of Das Ich. It gained popularity in the early 1990s, at the same time that the German Dark Wave movement experienced a marked upswing.

Deutsche Alternative Charts
Danse Macabre has had several albums chart on the DAC over the years:

Roster
According to the label's website on 29 January 2017.

 A Pale Moon
 A.T.Mödell
 Adrian H. & The Wounds
 Aeternitas
 Ari Mason
 Astari Nite
 Beati Mortui
 Berliner Bomben Chor
 Bettina Bormann
 Blitzmaschine
 Butzemann
 Cell Division
 Christ Vs. Warhol
 Cold Cold Ground
 ConcreteRage
 DaGeist
 Das Ich
 Deathless Legacy

 Defence Mechanism
 Delica-m
 Desdemona
 Devilskiss
 Eden Weint Im Grab
 Effter
 Eisenfunk
 ErilaZ
 Extinction Front
 Faith & The Muse
 Felsenreich
 Gothika
 Gothminister
 Hardwire
 Irrlicht
 Masquerade
 Metallspürhunde
 Midnight Caine

 Model Kaos
 Monica Richards
 Nano Infect
 Nehl Aëlin
 Nova-Spes
 Oberer Totpunkt
 Opioids
 Otto Dix
 Partly Faithful
 Place4tears
 PTYL
 Rabbit at War
 Schneewittchen
 Schwarzbund
 Shadow Image
 Silent Scream
 Stereomotion
 Stoneman

 Substaat
 Sweet Sister Pain
 Symbiotic Systems
 Synthetica
 The Beauty of Gemina
 The Breath Of Life
 The Daughters of Bristol
 The Drowning Man
 
 The Mescaline Babies
 The Raven
 The Spiritual Bat
 Theodor Bastard
 Tragic Black
 Unterschicht
 Vic Anselmo
 Virgin in Veil
 Waves under Water
 X-In June

References

External links 
 Official Website
 Official myspace page
 Label Discogs Entry

German record labels
Record labels established in 1989